The 3rd Assault Division was a Yugoslav Partisan division formed in Glamočko polje on 9 November 1942. Upon its formation it had around 3,200 soldiers from three brigades: 5th Proletarian Brigade, 10th Herzegovina Brigade and 1st Dalmatia Brigade. It was commanded by Pero Ćetković and its political commissar was Radomir Babić. During the Case Black, the division was disestablished after suffering heavy loses. It was re-established during the late September 1943 as a part of the 2nd Corps.

References 

Divisions of the Yugoslav Partisans
Military units and formations established in 1942